The Church of la Virgen de la Asunción (Spanish: Iglesia Parroquial de la Virgen de la Asunción (Romancos)) is a church located in Romancos, Brihuega, Spain. It was declared Bien de Interés Cultural in 1990.

The church was built in the late 15th and early 16th centuries in a late-Gothic style, designated Isabelino.

References 

Bien de Interés Cultural landmarks in the Province of Guadalajara
Churches in Castilla–La Mancha
15th-century Roman Catholic church buildings in Spain
Gothic architecture in Castilla–La Mancha
Brihuega